Amoli is a village in India , found within the Bhikia Sain Tehsil (block), in Almora district of Kumaon division in Uttarakhand state. It is the beautiful part of Uttarakhand it lies near the RAKSHESHWAR MAHADEV temple and VINAYAK degree collage

References

Villages in Almora district